Old School New School is an educational documentary film that examines the nature of creativity. It is produced by Steven Fischer and Diane Leigh Davison.

The movie started filming in 2007 and was completed in 2010, shooting on location in Los Angeles, New York, Maryland, and Virginia. In 2011, the film was acquired for distribution by Snag Films. The International Documentary Association in Los Angeles, California, is the fiscal sponsor. Films Media Group acquired the film in 2020.

Synopsis
An independent filmmaker travels the United States in search of meaningful conversations with world-renowned artists on the nature of creativity and how a person can realize his or her full creative potential. The movie is divided into three central themes: finding your voice, security versus risk, and the definition of success in the arts.

Cast
Brian Cox, actor of Manhunter, Braveheart, The Bourne Identity. 
William Fraker, cinematographer of Rosemary's Baby, Bullitt, WarGames.
Emanuel Azenberg, Broadway producer known for Rent, Biloxi Blues, Brighton Beach Memoirs.
Kirstie Simson, dance artist.
James Ragan, poet most noted for Womb Weary.
Sam McCready, playwright and scholar.
Ben Jones, actor known for The Dukes of Hazzard.
John Bailey, cinematographer known for American Gigolo, How to Lose a Guy in 10 Days, The Big Chill.
McCoy Tyner, jazz musician, member of The John Coltrane Quartet.
Tomas Arana, actor known for The Last Temptation of Christ, The Hunt for Red October, Gladiator.
Steven Fischer, filmmaker of Freedom Dance featuring Mariska Hargitay.

References
 Baltimore City Paper, Creative Proof
 Snag Films' Exclusive Interview with Steven Fischer
 IndieWire, 19 March 2012 Interview
 MovieMaker Magazine, Exploring the Mystery of Creativity with Old School New School 
 WGN Radio, Interview with Steven Fischer and James Ragan, 4 March 2012
 Old School, New School: The inspiring documentary by film-maker Steven Fischer,  SnapTwig.com
 One Film Fan Review: Old School New School

External links

Old School New School at SnagFilms.com
 MovieMaker Magazine, January 18, 2012, Exploring the Mystery of Creativity with Old School New School 
One Film Fan Review: Old School New School 

Documentary films about psychology
2010s English-language films